Paul James "Mackenzie" Crook (born 29 September 1971) is an English actor, comedian, director and writer. He played Gareth Keenan in The Office, Ragetti in the Pirates of the Caribbean films, Orell in the HBO series Game of Thrones, and the title role of Worzel Gummidge. He is also the creator and star of BBC Four's Detectorists (2014–2022), for which he won two BAFTA awards. He also plays major roles in TV series Britannia, as the opposite leading druids Veran and Harka.

Early life
Crook was born on 29 September 1971 in Maidstone, Kent, and grew up in Dartford, Kent. He is the son of Michael Crook, a British Airways employee, and Sheila Crook, a hospital manager. As a child he received a course of hormone therapy for three years to treat a growth hormone deficiency. He attended Wilmington Grammar School for Boys.
In the summers, he spent time at his uncle's tobacco farm in northern Zimbabwe, where he developed his love for painting.

Career

Film and television career
One of Crook's earliest television appearances was in the 1998 Channel 4 sketch show Barking, as a grotesque schoolteacher called Mr. Bagshaw, who is said to be based on a variety of obnoxious, overbearing science teachers he was taught by while in school.

He was offered his first major television role as a comedy sketch contributor on Channel 4's The Eleven O'Clock Show in 1998, from which Crook was later dropped. He was later a member of the main cast of the BBC sketch show TV to Go in 2001.

In late 1999 he hosted the short-lived ITV1 show Comedy Café in the guise of his Charlie Cheese character. The show made by Channel X for ITV1 had Charlie Cheese interviewing various celebrities about their latest live tour, book, album or film release.

In 2001, Crook auditioned for the role of Gareth Keenan in Ricky Gervais/Stephen Merchant popular mockumentary The Office. Though it was originally written for a larger, thuggish actor, Crook won the role, and by the end of the series in 2003 had earned two BAFTA nominations.

Crook was featured in Pirates of the Caribbean: The Curse of the Black Pearl (2003), Pirates of the Caribbean: Dead Man's Chest (2006), and Pirates of the Caribbean: At World's End (2007); as Ragetti, a pirate with a comically ill-fitting wooden false eye, who is teamed with Pintel (Lee Arenberg).

He has appeared in adverts as the character for Visa and M&Ms. He has also featured as himself in adverts for MTV and Film Four and as a voiceover artiste for motor insurance company Green Flag in 2007. In 2010 he provided a voice over in an advertisement for the electrical retailer Currys.

Crook also appeared as Launcelot Gobbo in Michael Radford's 2004 film adaptation of Shakespeare's The Merchant of Venice and had a minor role in the 2004 film Finding Neverland as a theatre usher. Other films he has appeared in include The Gathering (2003) and The Brothers Grimm (2005).

Crook has starred in three of Tim Plester and Ben Gregor's short films: as Gary Tibbs in Ant Muzak (2002), as Servalan in Blake's Junction 7 (2004), and as Glorious George in World of Wrestling (2006). All three of these films have been released on DVD. He has also voiced in a television series called Modern Toss and has featured in I Want Candy as Mr Dulberg, a quirky university professor, and voiced a character called Rolli Bobbler in the English version of an animated film from Finland called Quest for a Heart (original Finnish name Röllin Sydän). He also performed a duet with Ricky Gervais in the 2007 Concert for Diana.

Crook played the leading role of Paul Callow in the comedy film Three and Out, released on 25 April 2008. On 10 May 2008 he appeared in an episode of the BBC1 comedy/drama Love Soup playing the character Marty Cady and appeared in an episode of Andrew Davies' 2008 BBC adaptation of Charles Dickens' Little Dorrit. He also provided his voice and movements to a character in Steven Spielberg's The Adventures of Tintin: The Secret of the Unicorn, which began filming in January 2009 and was released in 2011.

Crook starred in Wyndham Price's drama Abraham's Point as Comet Snape and appeared in City of Ember as Looper, and on TV was featured in the documentary Tattoos: A Scarred History (2009). He also appeared in Big Brother Celebrity Hijack and the ITV drama Demons (originally titled The Last Van Helsing) as the vampire Gladiolus Hadilus Tradius Thrip. In January 2009, Crook featured in the second and third episodes of the third series of the E4 teen drama Skins, in which he played psychotic Bristol gangster Johnny White. He appeared in Merlin, for the first episode of the second season, as Cedric.

In November 2010, Crook starred in A Reluctant Tragic Hero, a comic play by Anton Chekhov, on the Sky Arts channel, which also starred Johnny Vegas, with whom he also starred in 2004's Sex Lives of the Potato Men, a film about the sexual antics of a group of potato delivery men in Birmingham.
Crook played Corporal Buckley, a brutal career soldier, in Jimmy McGovern's Accused, broadcast on BBC1 in November 2010.
During the 2012 San Diego Comic-Con it was announced that Crook would play the role of Orell in the third season of Game of Thrones.

Crook also wrote, directed and starred in the television comedy series Detectorists, which was first broadcast on BBC Four on 2 October 2014. Filmed in the countryside of Suffolk and the market town of Framlingham, the show is a gently humorous and affectionate portrayal of a pair of metal-detecting enthusiasts, Andy (Crook) and Lance (Toby Jones), and their colleagues in the fictional Danebury Metal Detecting Club. In 2015, Crook won a British Academy Television Craft Award for Best Writing in a Comedy Series for the show, whilst the series won the British Academy Television Award for Best Situation Comedy. A second series was broadcast in the UK in October/November 2015. A Christmas special was broadcast on 23 December 2015. In 2017 the third and final series of Detectorists was broadcast. A final special episode was released for Christmas 2022.

Crook then played the role of 'Nestor of Maddox' in the television fantasy-comedy series Yonderland, which was broadcast on Sky One, and was starring and written by the  cast of the educational historical comedy series Horrible Histories. He plays the father of the main character Debbie, played by Martha Howe-Douglas, and appears in three episodes of series 2: episodes 1, 2 and 4.

Theatre
Crook played Billy Bibbit in the 2004 London West End production of the stage play of One Flew Over the Cuckoo's Nest opposite Christian Slater, and in 2006 he appeared in The Exonerated at the Riverside Studios in Hammersmith.

He starred in director Ian Rickson's production of The Seagull opposite Kristin Scott Thomas, as the troubled writer Konstantin for which he earned a nomination from the Evening Standard Theatre Awards. Starting at the Royal Court Theatre in London in February/March 2007, it transferred to Broadway in September 2008. In December 2008 he finished the Broadway run of The Seagull at the Walter Kerr Theatre.

From 15 July to 15 August 2009 Crook appeared at the Royal Court Theatre in Jez Butterworth's Jerusalem. He and the play received positive reviews and it was transferred to the West End's Apollo Theatre in February 2010. In May 2011 he was nominated for the Tony Award for Best Featured Actor in a Play, for his role in the Broadway transfer of the show and also appeared in the 2011 London revival. Another revival of the play is scheduled for 2022 at the Apollo Theatre, featuring the creative team from the first production as well as Mark Rylance and Crook in their original roles as Johnny "Rooster" Byron and Ginger.

On 18 April 2010,  Crook took part in the fund raising event We Are One, a celebration of tribal peoples, in aid of indigenous rights organisation Survival International, at the Apollo Theatre, Shaftesbury Avenue. The evening was a performance of tribal prose and poetry from some of the UK and Hollywood's leading actors and musicians. The event was created and directed by Mark Rylance. Crook appeared in the play "Aliens" at the Bush Theatre in October 2010 and in early 2012 appeared in The Recruiting Officer at the Donmar Warehouse.

In 2021, Crook starred in the play "Jerusalem" at the Apollo Theatre.

Other work
Crook has directed a music video for the London electro band Paw Paw (his sister Zoe is one of the band members). The stop motion animation video accompanies the band's debut single 'Wired OK', released on 16 July 2007 on Albino Recordings.
Crook appeared as a postman in the music video for Paul McCartney's single "Dance Tonight" alongside actress Natalie Portman. The video for the song was directed by Michel Gondry and was posted exclusively on YouTube on 22 May 2007.

Crook has a deal with publisher Faber to illustrate and write a children's book. His first one, The Windvale Sprites, was released in November 2011. It was announced on 8 February 2012, that Crook's book was nominated for the Waterstones Children's Book Prize, in the 5–12-year-old category. The book contains references to a storm in 1987 which hit Dartford and surrounding areas.

On 9 April 2010 it was announced that Crook would star in the music video for Slow Club's new single, "Giving Up on Love", after band member Rebecca Taylor wrote to him.
Crook regularly works in radio, and appeared in the BBC Radio Four show North by Northamptonshire, in 2011 alongside Geoffrey Palmer, Sheila Hancock, Lizzie Roper and Jessica Henwick.

Crook narrated the audiobook version of the novel Charlotte Street by Danny Wallace.

Crook's first jobs included working at a Pizza Hut restaurant and also at Halfords where he felt he was "waiting for real life to start".

Personal life
Crook is left handed. Crook and his wife, Lindsay, a former advertising executive, live in Muswell Hill, London. They were married in April 2001 and have a son and a daughter. Crook is an atheist.

In February 2023, Crook's sister-in-law, his wife's older sister, Laurel Aldridge went missing in West Sussex after she failed to attend her fifth chemotherapy appointment. Aldridge had been diagnosed with cancer a year ago. Crook made a public appeal on Good Morning Britain on 21 February 2023. On 25 February 2023, it was announced that a body had been found, but no identification had been made public. On 2 March 2023, it was announced that the body had been identified as Crook's missing sister-in-law.

Filmography

Film

Television

References

External links

1971 births
Living people
Male actors from Kent
English atheists
English stand-up comedians
English male film actors
English male stage actors
English male television actors
People educated at Wilmington Grammar School for Boys
People from Maidstone
English male Shakespearean actors
20th-century English male actors
21st-century English male actors
21st-century English writers
English television directors
English screenwriters
English male screenwriters
English television writers
21st-century British screenwriters
21st-century English male writers